William Thomas Delworth (February 24, 1929 – October 29, 2012) was a Canadian diplomat and academic.

Born near Weston, Ontario, Delworth studied at Weston Collegiate and Vocational School and at the University of Toronto where he received a Bachelor of Arts in psychology in 1951 and a Master of Arts degree in modern history in 1956. A diplomat, he was the Canadian Ambassador to Indonesia (1970-1974), Hungary (1975-1978), Sweden (1984-1988), and the Federal Republic of Germany (1987-1992).

After retiring in 1993 he taught at the University of Toronto where he was appointed Provost of Trinity College from 1996 to 2002. He died in Ottawa in 2012.

References

1929 births
2012 deaths
Ambassadors of Canada to Germany
Ambassadors of Canada to Hungary
Ambassadors of Canada to Indonesia
Ambassadors of Canada to Sweden
University of Toronto alumni